A statue of John Deighton was commissioned in 1970, and was sculpted by Vern Simpson. Its location moved to various spots in Vancouver's Gastown neighborhood, in British Columbia, Canada. It was finally installed at a spot near where Deighton (also known as "Gassy Jack") had opened the Globe Saloon in 1867. On February 14, 2022, the statue was toppled by protesters.

History
Deighton (November 1830 – May 23, 1875) was a Canadian bar owner who was born in Hull, England. He travelled to California and then New Caledonia (now British Columbia, Canada) as a gold prospector, before operating bars in New Westminster and later on the south side of Burrard Inlet. The area later became known as Gastown, from Deighton's nickname "Gassy Jack".

The statue was sculpted by Vern Simpson, after being commissioned in 1970 by a group of Gastown developers, and over the years, moved to various locations in Vancouver's Gastown neighborhood. It came to rest at the intersection of Carrall and Water streets, near where Deighton had built the Globe Saloon in 1867, one of the first buildings in Vancouver.

In B.C. in 1870, the legal age of marriage was 12 years old with parental consent, and 21 years old without parental consent. In 1870, Gassy Jack Deighton, at 40 years old,  married 12 year old Quahail-ya.

"Cease Wyss — or T'uy't'tanat — is a Squamish cultural leader and has researched Squamish women for years.

According to Squamish oral history, the 12-year-old Indigenous girl eventually ran away from her much-older husband at the age of 15. Wyss says this makes her a model for Indigenous women to look up to.

Archival documents from the City of Vancouver Archives say Quahail-ya did marry Deighton at 12 years old after her aunt died.  The archives make no mention of an escape at age 15, but say Quahail-ya moved to North Vancouver after Deighton's death. She died in 1948 at approximately 90 years old."

In June 2020, a petition calling for its removal had gathered over 1,500 signatures in five days, eventually reaching over 23,000 signatures. It was toppled on February 14, 2022, by protesters during the 31st annual Women's Memorial March for Missing and Murdered Indigenous Women and Girls. The pedestal was removed on April 4, 2022.

See also
 Monuments and memorials in Canada removed in 2020–2022

References

External links

 

2022 disestablishments in British Columbia
Monuments and memorials in Vancouver
Outdoor sculptures in Vancouver
Sculptures of men in Canada
Statues in Canada
Statues removed in 2022
Vandalized works of art in Canada